Earl Leonard Craven (November 24, 1922 – July 27, 2000) was an American football and basketball coach and college athletics administrator in the United States. He was president of the NAIA Coaches Association from 1957 through 1959. He also initiated a nationwide appeal to cease marketing efforts of alcoholic beverages at college sports events and campuses.

Playing career
Craven entered Pacific College (now called George Fox University) in Newberg, Oregon during the fall of 1941. His time in college was interrupted by military service in World War II from 1943 to 1946, but he returned to Pacific and was awarded letters in basketball, baseball and football. Craven earned a degree in psychology and education in 1949.

Coaching career

Taylor
Craven was named the head coach at Taylor University in Upland, Indiana beginning with the 1955 season.

William Penn
In 1958, Craven was hired as the head football coach and athletic director at William Penn College—now known as William Penn University—in Oskaloosa, Iowa. William Penn athletics had been in a slump for 20 years. Craven worked to boost attendance and improve the program. Craven's first football team at William Penn recorded the most wins in a single season to date and ended with a record of 7–2, including the program's first win over the Central Dutch in 20 years. His record at the school was 26–18–2.

George Fox
In February, 1963, Craven was appointed athletic director and director of admissions at George Fox University. He resigned as athletic and head football coach at George Fox in 1967 to become director of physical education  at Clatsop Community College.

Head coaching record

Football

References

External links
 

1922 births
2000 deaths
American men's basketball players
Basketball coaches from Kansas
Basketball players from Kansas
Friends Falcons football coaches
George Fox Bruins athletic directors
George Fox Bruins baseball players
George Fox Bruins football coaches
George Fox Bruins football players
George Fox Bruins men's basketball coaches
George Fox Bruins men's basketball players
Taylor Trojans football coaches
William Penn Statesmen athletic directors
William Penn Statesmen football coaches
William Penn Statesmen men's basketball coaches
American military personnel of World War II
People from Barton County, Kansas